The Miss Mundo Dominicana 2005 pageant was held on July 11, 2005, with 28 candidates competing for the national crown. The winner, Elisa Abreu de los Santos, represented the Dominican Republic at the Miss World 2005.

Results

Fast Track Awards

 Miss Internet* - Exilia Martínez (Duarte)
 Sport Miss* -  Lucía de Lara (San Cristóbal)
 Best Beach Dominican Beauty* - Marta Reynoso (Monte Plata)
 Beauty with a Purpose* - Joanie Polanco (Com. Dom. Pennsylvania)
 *Classify to the Semifinals.

Special awards
 Miss Photogenic (voted by press reporters) - Lorraine Peralta (Com. Dom. Miami)
 Miss Congeniality (voted by contestants) - Anna Merán (La Romana)
 Miss Elegancia - Yudith Morales (Puerto Plata)

Miss Dominican Regions

Miss Exterior : Joanie Polanco (Com. Dom. Pennsylvania)
Miss Region del Centro Cibao : Elisa Abreu (La Vega)
Miss Region del Cibao Occidental : Yudith Morales (Puerto Plata)
Miss Region del Cibao Oriental : Yamel Mora (María Trinidad Sánchez)
Miss Region del Sur Occidente : Daniela Peguero (Peravia)
Miss Region del Sur Oriente : Natasha Romero (Distrito Nacional)

Delegates

Trivia
Joselyn Taveras, Miss Santiago entered Miss Dominican Republic 2004 and Reina Nacional de Belleza Miss República Dominicana 2005.
Yudith Morales, Miss Puerto Plata entered Reina Nacional de Belleza Miss República Dominicana 2005.
Yamel Mora, Miss María Trinidad Sánchez would enter Reina Nacional de Belleza Miss República Dominicana 2006.
Daniela Peguero, Miss Peravia would enter Reina Nacional de Belleza Miss República Dominicana 2007.
Natasha Romero, Miss Distrito Nacional entered Miss Dominican Republic 2005.

External links
 https://web.archive.org/web/20080813181349/http://www.missmundo.com.do/index_viejo.html

Miss Dominican Republic
2005 beauty pageants
2005 in the Dominican Republic